Zeit der Störche is a 1971 East German film. With 5,814,977 admissions it was the 12th most successful film in East Germany.

References

External links
 

1971 films
East German films
1970s German films